Premio Lo Nuestro 2003 was the 15th anniversary of the awards. the show was hosted by Mexican presenters Marco Antonio Regil and Adal Ramones. Juanes, Thalía, Marc Anthony, Pilar Montenegro, Sin Bandera, Banda el Recodo and other Latin music greats gave electrifying performances. In the show, there was 36 awards winners with 135 nominations. In Pop genre, Awards was given for : Album of the Year, Best Male Artist, Best Female Artist, Best Group or duo, Best New Artist and Song of the Year. In Rock Genre : Best Rock Album and Best rock Performer of the Year. In Tropical genre : Best Tropical Album of the Year, Best Tropical Male Artist, Best Tropical Female Artist, Best Tropical Group or Duo of the Year, Best Tropical New Artist, Tropical Song of the Year, Best Merengue Performance, Best Salsa Performance and Best Traditional Performance. Juanes was the biggest winner of night, took home four awards Best Pop Male Artist, Best Music Video, Best Rock Performance, and Pop Song of the Year . In the Regional Mexican, Pilar Montenegro took three awards for Regional Mexican Song of the Year, Pop Song of the Year ("Quitame Ese Hombre"), and for Best Regional Mexican Female Artist. In the tropical genre, Celia Cruz took home with four great awards of the night for Best Salsa Performance, Best Tropical Female Artist, Best Tropical Song of the year and Tropical Album of the Year. At the night, the greatest performance was a medley of top Latin hits from the last 15 years, performed by the artists that made them famous, including Vikki Carr, Son by Four, Los Ilegales, La Mafia, Luis Enrique, Wilfrido Vargas and Olga Tañón. There was a great tribute to Celia Cruz by the world-famous salsa group "Fania All-Stars", of which Cruz was a member during the 1970s, reunited for an exclusive performance that rocked the house.

Appearances
Alejandra Guzmán
Alejandro Montaner
Alicia Machado
Arath de la Torre
Cynthia Klitbo
Edith González
Erika Buenfil
Jennifer Peña
Jon Secada
Jorge Aravena
Maribel Guardia
Roselyn Sánchez
Saúl Lisazo
Scarlet Ortiz
Sofía Vergara
Valentino Lanús

Performances
Banda el Recodo
Fania All-Stars
Juanes
Marc Anthony
Pilar Montenegro
Sin Bandera
Thalía
Medley Performance performers:
Vikki Carr
Son by Four
Los Ilegales
La Mafia
Luis Enrique
Wilfrido Vargas
Olga Tañón.

Nominees and winners

Special awards
Excellence Award: Luis Miguel
Premio del Pueblo (People's Choice):
Pop: Thalía
Rock: Shakira
Tropical: Marc Anthony
Regional/Mexican: Vicente Fernández
Urban: El General

Pop category

Rock category

Tropical category

Regional Mexican category

Urban category

Popular award

References
http://www.thefreelibrary.com/Thalia,+Alejandro+Sanz,+Paulina+Rubio,+Enrique+Iglesias,+Lupillo...-a094388051

Lo Nuestro Awards by year
2003 music awards
2003 in Florida
2003 in Latin music
2000s in Miami